Denys Oleksandrovych Chernysh (born 29 June 1999) is a Ukrainian professional footballer who plays as a right back for Ukrainian club Hirnyk-Sport Horishni Plavni.

References

External links
 

1999 births
Living people
People from Kremenchuk
Ukrainian footballers
Association football defenders
FC Olimpik Donetsk players
FC Kremin Kremenchuk players
FC Hirnyk-Sport Horishni Plavni players
Ukrainian First League players
Sportspeople from Poltava Oblast